Reality is an 2023 American drama film, directed by Tina Satter from a screenplay by Satter and James Paul Dallas, adapted from the FBI interrogation transcript of American inteligence whistleblower Reality Winner, which Satter previously staged as the play Is This A Room. It stars Sydney Sweeney as Winner, with Marchánt Davis and Josh Hamilton in supporting roles.

Reality premiered at the 2023 Berlin International Film Festival on February 18, 2023. It will be distributed by HBO Films.

Cast
 Sydney Sweeney as Reality Winner
 Marchánt Davis as Taylor (R. Wallace Taylor)
 Josh Hamilton as Garrick (Justin C. Garrick)

Production
The film depicts the interrogation of whistleblower Reality Winner, which took place on the day of her arrest on June 3, 2017. Winner, a former enlisted US Air Force member and NSA translator, leaked an intelligence report about Russian interference in the 2016 United States elections to the news website The Intercept. Winner was confronted at her home in Augusta, Georgia by FBI agents R. Wallace Taylor and Justin C. Garrick, who interrogated her over the course of an hour in an unused room in the house.

Tina Satter turned the interrogation transcript into the verbatim theatre performance Is This A Room (based on the quote "Is this a room? Is that a room?" spoken by one of the interrogators), which premiered at The Kitchen in 2019 before an extended Off-Broadway run at the Vineyard Theatre later that year. The production starred Emily Davis as Winner, with Pete Simpson and TL Thompson as the interrogators, and Becca Blackwell as "Unknown Male", a classification in the transcript for dialogue from multiple FBI agents who were inspecting Winner's house during the interrogation. The play premiered on Broadway at the Lyceum Theatre on October 10, 2021, and closed on November 27, 2021. Winner herself was not involved with the production during its initial Off-Broadway run due to her imprisonment, and was unable to see the Broadway production due to still being under house arrest, but spoke with the creative team extensively following her release from prison and video-called into the opening night performance's curtain call.

In June 2022, it was announced that Is This A Room would be adapted into a film, with Sydney Sweeney, Marchánt Davis and Josh Hamilton starring and Satter directing in her film debut, from a screenplay she wrote alongside James Paul Davis.

Principal photography began in May 2022, over the course of 16 days.

Release
The film received its world premiere at the 2023 Berlin International Film Festival on February 18, 2023. Shortly after, HBO Films acquired distribution rights to the film.

Reception

Reality received positive reviews from critics at Berlinale, with praise aimed at Satter's direction as well as the cast performances (particularly Sweeney's). On the review aggregator website Rotten Tomatoes, the film has a rare approval rating of 100%, based on 9 critic reviews with an average rating of 8.4/10. Metacritic, which uses a weighted average, assigned a score of 87 out of 100, based on 9 reviews indicating "universal acclaim". 

David Rooney of The Hollywood Reporter praised the transition from the minimalist set design of Is This A Room to the film's realistic recreation of Winner's house, noting "Satter shows unfaltering command of the medium for a first-time film director," highlighting the use of the closeup as a direct translation of the play's surreal storytelling.

References

External links
 

2023 films
American drama films
Films about whistleblowing